Elizabeth Jane Smith (born 27 February 1960) is a Scottish politician who has been Member of the Scottish Parliament (MSP) for Mid Scotland and Fife since 2007. A member of the Scottish Conservative Party, she has served as Shadow Cabinet Secretary for Finance and the Economy since 2021.

Before entering parliament, Smith was a schoolteacher and political researcher, as well as an amateur sportswoman, representing the Scottish women's cricket team. She was first elected in 2007 and re-elected in 2011 and 2016, having earlier stood unsuccessfully for the Parliament of the United Kingdom at the 2001 general election in the Perth constituency, where she missed out to the SNP by just 48 votes. She stood as a constituency candidate in the Perth constituency at the Scottish Parliament in 2007 and again in the newly established Perthshire South and Kinross-shire constituency in both 2011 and 2016, missing out by 1,422 votes in 2016. Smith served as Shadow Cabinet Secretary for Education and Skills from 2016 to 2020 and as Shadow Cabinet Secretary for Environment, Climate Change and Land Reform from 2020 to 2021.

Early life and sporting career
Smith was born in Edinburgh, and attended George Watson's College before going on to the University of Edinburgh to study politics and economics and gain a Diploma in Education. After graduating, she returned to George Watson's College as a member of the staff, where she taught economics and modern studies. Smith left the teaching profession in 1997 to work as an advisor to Sir Malcolm Rifkind. Between 2001 and 2003, she worked at the Scottish Conservatives' central office, as head of the office of the chairman.

A keen sportswoman, Smith played club cricket for many years, but was not given an opportunity to play at a higher level until 2000, when the Scottish national side was reassembled for the first time since 1979. Her first match for the national team came against Cumbria, an English county team, but she neither batted nor bowled as her team cruised to a ten-wicket victory.

In 2001, Smith was selected in the Scottish squad for the 2001 European Championship, where matches held One Day International (ODI) status. On her international debut against England, she was 41 years and 164 days old, making her the fourth-oldest ODI debutant on record, and the oldest to debut since 1978. Smith made nine-ball ducks against both England and Ireland, and against the Netherlands.

Smith remains the oldest Scottish player, male or female, to appear in a full ODI. She has remained involved in promoting the sport since retiring, and in April 2014, following a reconstitution of the organisation, was elected the inaugural president of the Scottish Women's Cricket Association (SWCA), aligned with Cricket Scotland. Outside of cricket, Smith has an interest in mountaineering and hillwalking, having taken part in expeditions to the Alps and the Himalayas. After climbing Slioch in July 2012, she completed the feat of "bagging the Munros" (climbing every mountain in Scotland over a set height). She had begun the task in 1982, with a climb of Ben Nevis, and after entering parliament used her climbs to raise funds for charity.

Parliament
Smith was narrowly beaten (by just 48 votes) to the Perth seat at the 2001 General Election by the SNP's Annabelle Ewing. She made The Herald Scottish Politician of the Year shortlist for 'The One to Watch' in 2007. Smith acted as campaign manager for Murdo Fraser in his leadership election campaign in 2011.

She was first elected to the Scottish Parliament for the Mid Scotland and Fife electoral region in 2007 and re-elected in 2011 and 2016, having earlier stood unsuccessfully for the Parliament of the United Kingdom at the 2001 UK general election in the Perth constituency, where she missed out to the SNP by just 48 votes. She stood as a constituency candidate in the Perth constituency at the Scottish Parliament in 2007 and again in the newly established Perthshire South and Kinross-shire constituency in both 2011 and 2016, missing out by 1,422 votes in 2016.

Smith is shadow cabinet secretary for education and skills.
She sits on the Education and Skills Committee of the Scottish Parliament.
She is also the chair of the Parliament's Cross Party Group on Colleges and Universities and co-chairs the Cross Party Group on Sport.

Controversy 

Smith was criticised in 2018 by Holyrood's standards committee for forwarding a confidential dossier on allegations of bullying at George Watson's College to the school. Smith, who was a governor of the school at the time, forwarded an e-mail about bullying allegations to the chairman of the board of governors at the school and to its principal. The documents detailed specific allegations about the treatment of their child. Parents claimed Smith had disclosed information to others to which she had privileged access as an MSP.

References

External links 
 
Scottish Conservatives Page
They Work For You

1960 births
Living people
Alumni of the University of Edinburgh
People educated at George Watson's College
Conservative MSPs
Female members of the Scottish Parliament
Members of the Scottish Parliament 2007–2011
Members of the Scottish Parliament 2011–2016
Members of the Scottish Parliament 2016–2021
Politicians from Edinburgh
Scotland women One Day International cricketers
Scottish cricket administrators
Scottish mountain climbers
Scottish women cricketers
Staff of George Watson's College
Scottish Conservative Party parliamentary candidates
Members of the Scottish Parliament 2021–2026